The "Del Monte Trophy" was held on the twisty, leafy, and very narrow town roads  in Pebble Beach, California from 1950 through 1956. The races were managed under the auspices of the SCCA (Sports Car Club of America), as were most races from that day to this.

The search for an appropriate route for the race began at the famous 17 Mile Drive but that later proved unsuitable. After evaluating several alternatives, a collection of roads near the Lodge at Pebble Beach was chosen, partly for its location and partly because it was short enough and tight enough that it wouldn't overtax some of the small cars of the day.

Not all of the "track" was paved; the original 1950 route consisted of both paved two-lane roads and sections of dirt or loose gravel. Races started along Portola Road near the present-day equestrian center. Cars then turned right onto Sombria Lane, then right again onto Drake Road. In 1950, drivers would turn right once again onto Forest Lake Road; in 1951 and later years they turned left onto Alvarado Lane (now Stevenson Drive), then sharp right onto Forest Lake. The final corner was a sharp right-hander at Ondulado back onto Portola and past the start/finish line.

Although the course was always tight and twisty with tall Cypress trees hemming in the track on either side, accidents were scarce and relatively uneventful. The exception came in 1956 when Ernie McAfee (no relation to fellow racer Jack McAfee) fatally slammed his Ferrari into a tree. This spelled the end of the popular Pebble Beach Road Races, although it was the genesis of Laguna Seca Raceway, its modern-day successor.

Here is an aerial view of the location. Google map The track appears as a lopsided T-shape tilted by about 45 degrees, between the Cypress Point Club (to the north) and the Peter Hay golf course (to the south). The present-day equestrian center occupies some of the space on the infield by the old start/finish line. The famous Pebble Beach Golf Links are just a stone's throw to the southeast.

The Pebble Beach Road Race course has been recreated in a computer game. Grand Prix Legends allows players to download user-created tracks, and a simulation of the Pebble Beach course is available here.

For the future, it looks as though the Pebble Beach Road Race course will soon be obliterated. One or two of the 1950s-era roads have already been developed or rerouted, and the corporation that owns and manages Pebble Beach is planning a major overhaul of the area that includes demolishing many of the roads that served as part of the race course. Visitors can drive most (but not all) of the old race course today. Simply pay the standard $10.75US entrance fee and follow your map.

External links 
 http://jimturley.tripod.com/

Auto races in the United States
History of Monterey County, California
Sports in Monterey County, California